Bratić is a surname. Notable people with the surname include:

Aleksandar Bratić (born 1972), Bosnian-Herzegovinian footballer
Blagoje Bratić (1946–2008), Bosnian-Canadian footballer
Davor Bratić (born 1986), Croatian footballer
Mladen Bratić (1933–1991), major general in the Yugoslav People's Army
Saša Bratić (born 1981), Serbian basketball player
Vesna Bratić (born 1977), former Minister of Education, Science, Culture and Sports of Montenegro
Vidak Bratić (born 1976), Serbian footballer

Serbian surnames